The 1885 Southern Rugby Union season was the 12th season of the Sydney Rugby Premiership. This was the third competition for the Gardiner Cup which was awarded to the winners of the premiership. The football season lasted from May till September 1885. The season culminated in the premiership, which was won by Sydney University. University were awarded the Gardiner Challenge Cup and were crowned premiers by a committee of the Union. The club were undefeated during the premiership season.

Teams 
In 1885, the Union decided to elevate three Junior clubs into the Gardiner Challenge Cup. Arfoma, St. Leonards and Newtown had performed well during the previous season and were given the opportunity to compete for the cup.

Rule changes
In 1885 the Sydney Rugby Premiership continued to develop into a more structured competition. Before the season began, the Southern Rugby Football Union decided to promote three Junior Clubs into the Gardiner Challenge Cup. This took the competing teams to eight. The number of games during the season also increased, with most of the teams playing each other twice. However, at the conclusion of the season, some clubs had not played the same number of games as others. The competition still did not see organised rounds and an official points ladder.

Season summary 
Overall, the season was not seen as being as brilliant as the previous. The Association Cricket Ground became unavailable during the season, which had an effect upon the games being played. This ground was the only one that fenced in the playing field. As a result, many games were interrupted by the crowds encroaching upon the field. The Agricultural Society made their ground available to the Union later in the season, with two games often being played side-by-side. This did see some confusion with players stopping play in one game on hearing the call from the other game.

Despite a deficit in their defence and kicking, the Sydney University Football Club proved to be the Premier club and were awarded the Gardiner Challenge Cup. The 'Varsity were well organised and displayed consistent form during the season. The team put the same players onto the field each week. As a result, the club were undefeated during the cup campaign with their only losses coming from non-cup games with a weakened team.

The Wallaroo Football Club displayed occasional brilliance on the field. On a good day, they demonstrated excellent forward play. However, a heavy schedule of 20 games across all matches saw the club become inconsistent in their performance. In 14 Cup games, the team won 8. Despite being beaten by Burwood, Wallaroo were ranked second for the season due to winning more games.

Last season's Premiers, Burwood, were considered the more all-round team. They were splendidly led by their captain Samuel Chapman who had spent some time playing in Cambridge. Using the experience gained, he encouraged his players to back each other. The club finished their season with a draw against the eventual champions, displaying the potential of the team.

Ladder

1885 Gardiner Challenge Cup

 The ladder shown above was calculated using results of games published in newspapers of the period. Only games indicated as Gardiner Challenge Cup games or games between cup teams were included. Games against non-cup teams were not included. Ladders published in newspapers of the period included games against teams not included in the cup. Inconsistencies occur between the ladders published and the results recorded. This may be due to the Union altering results as a result of protests.

Lower grades 
The Southern Rugby Football Union classified the participating clubs into two groups, Seniors and Juniors. Prior to 1883, all clubs were considered for the Premiership. With the introduction of the Gardiner Challenge Cup, only Senior clubs participated in the competition. The Junior clubs competed with each other, but no award was recognised for their achievements. Matches between Senior and Junior teams were common place, with results in those matches possibly assisting in deciding the final Senior Premiership winner.

In 1885, the top Junior Clubs were Balmain Wellington and Rosedale who were both undefeated for the season.

Representative games

Intercolonial matches 
In 1885, the New South Wales Rugby team visited Brisbane to play two matches against the Queensland team. For the first time, the Gardiner Cup continued to be played. This saw some of the local clubs losing valuable players and were thus unable to form a team to play their matches. Some controversy was present in the newspapers concerning the selection of certain NSW players and the omittance of other players in the team. With this in mind, the Queensland team had the edge in the first match, defeating NSW 14 points to nil. After this success, the Queensland team was seen to be a little over confident heading into the second match. As a result, they were out classed and were defeated by NSW 12 points to 2.

Team and player records

Top 10 point scorers

Top 10 try scorers

Most points in a match (team)

Greatest winning margin

Participating clubs

References

External links
 Sydney Club Rugby History.
 NSW Waratahs All-time player list.
 Queensland Reds All-time player list. 

1885 in Australian sport
1885 in rugby union
Rugby union competitions in New South Wales